Mammillaria is one of the largest genera in the cactus family (Cactaceae), with currently 200 known species and varieties recognized. Most of the mammillaria are native to Mexico, but some come from the southwest United States, the Caribbean, Colombia, Venezuela, Guatemala and Honduras. The common name "pincushion cactus" refers to this and the closely related genus Escobaria.

The first species was described by Carl Linnaeus as Cactus mammillaris in 1753, deriving its name from Latin mammilla, "nipple", referring to the tubercles that are among the distinctive features of the genus. Numerous species are commonly known as globe cactus, nipple cactus, birthday cake cactus, fishhook cactus or pincushion cactus though such terms may also be used for related taxa, particularly Escobaria.

Description
The distinctive feature of the genus is the possession of an areole split into two clearly separated parts, one occurring at the apex of the tubercle, the other at its base. The apex part is spine bearing, and the base part is always spineless, but usually bears some bristles or wool. The base part of the areole bears the flowers and fruits, and is a branching point. The apex part of the areole does not carry flowers, but in certain conditions can function as a branching point as well.

Tubercles can be conical, cylindrical, pyramidal or round. The roots are fibrous, fleshy or tuberous. The fruit is berry-like, club-shaped or elongated, usually red but sometimes white, magenta, yellow or green. Some species have the fruit embedded into the plant body.

Taxonomy

The genus Mammillaria in the family Cactaceae was proposed by Adrian Hardy Haworth in 1812. Initial spellings varied by authors but Mammillaria is now recognized as the accepted spelling. The first species in the genus was described by Carl Linnaeus in 1753 as Cactus mammillaris. The name Cactus became so confused that the 1905 Vienna botanical congress rejected Cactus as a genus name, and conserved Mammillaria.

Mammillaria is a large and diverse genus with  many species often exhibiting variations due to the nature of terrain, weather, soil and other ecological factors. As a result, subdivisions within the species has been rather inconsistent over time. Initially, some investigators were more inclined to consider each variation as a unique species, although as time went on, creating confusion and long synonymy-lists for some of the species. Over time, new investigators began grouping closely related forms under the same name to attempt to more accurately define the species.

Several systems for classification began to emerge. The first of note, created by Schumann and modified by Berger, divided the species into ten named groups. However, the criteria for these divisions was somewhat indefinite and flexible. In the early 1923, cactologists Nathaniel Lord Britton and Joseph Nelson Rose developed the Britton & Rose system which arranged the classification characteristics in a system of keys with tangible separation factors, resulting in a much more workable system of identification.

Later classification was performed by the cactus specialists Hunt, Reppenhagen and Luthy, with much work focusing on researching the meanings and value of the original plant descriptions, synchronizing them with modern taxonomic requirements and studying the morphology of plants and seeds, as well as ecological aspects of the genus. These works helped to expand the understanding of Mammillaria taxa.

Currently the classification of Mammillaria is in a state where few newly discovered species are likely, though some new species may yet be found when the chaos of names created earlier by commercial plant collectors is sorted out. Many names that were introduced for plants barely differentiated by a shade of flower colour or variation in spination were eliminated in attempt to make the use of names consistent with the rest of the botanical world. The number of taxa, which at one time numbered above 500, is now below 200. Some genera (Dolichothele, Mammillopsis, Krainzia and others) have been merged back into Mammillaria, and others  like Coryphantha, Escobaria and Mammilloydia were confirmed as separate.

Intense studies of DNA of the genus are being conducted, with preliminary results published for over a hundred taxa, and this promising approach might soon end the arguments. Based on DNA research results, the genus does not seem to be monophyletic and is likely to be split into two large genera, one of them possibly including certain species of other closely related genera like Coryphantha, Ortegocactus and the formerly recognized Neolloydia.

Selected species
As noted above, some might not belong in this genus.

 Mammillaria albicoma
 Mammillaria albiflora
 Mammillaria albilanata
 Mammillaria angelensis
 Mammillaria anniana
 Mammillaria aureilanata
 Mammillaria aurihamata
 Mammillaria backebergiana
 Mammillaria barbata – green fishhook cactus
 Mammillaria baumii
 Mammillaria beneckei
 Mammillaria berkiana
 Mammillaria blossfeldiana
 Mammillaria bocasana
 Mammillaria bocasana f. multilanata – powder-puff pincushion
 Mammillaria bocasana ssp. eschauzieri – Eschauzier's pincushion
 Mammillaria bombycina – silken pincushion
 Mammillaria boolii
 Mammillaria brachytrichion
 Mammillaria brandegeei
 Mammillaria carmenae
 Mammillaria carnea
 Mammillaria celsiana
 Mammillaria centricirrha
 Mammillaria columbiana
 Mammillaria compressa – mother of hundreds
 Mammillaria crinita – rose pincushion cactus
 Mammillaria crocidata
 Mammillaria crucigera
 Mammillaria decipiens
 Mammillaria deherdtiana
 Mammillaria dioica – strawberry cactus, California fishhook cactus
 Mammillaria discolor
 Mammillaria dixanthocentron
 Mammillaria duwei
 Mammillaria elegans
 Mammillaria elongata – ladyfinger cactus
 Mammillaria fraileana
 Mammillaria gasseriana
 Mammillaria geminispina – twin-spined cactus
 Mammillaria geminispina f. cristate – crested twin-spined cactus
 Mammillaria gigantea
 Mammillaria glassii
 Mammillaria glochidiata
 Mammillaria goodridgei
 Mammillaria goodridgei var. goodridgei
 Mammillaria goodridgei var. rectispina
 Mammillaria grahamii – Arizona fishhook cactus
 Mammillaria grahamii var. oliviae – Pitahayita
 Mammillaria grusonii
 Mammillaria guelzowiana
 Mammillaria guerreronis
 Mammillaria guillauminiana
 Mammillaria haageana
 Mammillaria hahniana – old lady cactus
 Mammillaria hernandezii
 Mammillaria herrerae
 Mammillaria heyderi
 Mammillaria huitzilopochtli
 Mammillaria humboldtii
 Mammillaria johnstonii
 Mammillaria karwinskiana – royal cross mammillaria
 Mammillaria klissingiana
 Mammillaria kraehenbuehlii
 Mammillaria krameri
 Mammillaria lasiacantha – golf-ball pincushion cactus
 Mammillaria laui
 Mammillaria lenta
 Mammillaria longiflora
 Mammillaria longimamma – finger cactus
 Mammillaria luethyi
 Mammillaria magnifica
 Mammillaria magnimamma – Mexican pincushion
 Mammillaria mainiae – counterclockwise pincushion
 Mammillaria mammillaris
 Mammillaria marcosii
 Mammillaria marksiana – cabeza de viejo
 Mammillaria mathildae
 Mammillaria matudae
 Mammillaria meiacantha
 Mammillaria melaleuca
 Mammillaria melanocentra
 Mammillaria mercadensis
 Mammillaria microhelia
 Mammillaria microthele
 Mammillaria muehlenpfordtii
 Mammillaria morganiana
 Mammillaria multidigitata
 Mammillaria mystax
 Mammillaria neopalmeri
 Mammillaria nivosa – woolly nipple cactus
 Mammillaria nunezii
 Mammillaria painteri
 Mammillaria parkinsonii – owl's eyes
 Mammillaria pectinifera – conchilinque
 Mammillaria pennispinosa
 Mammillaria perbella
 Mammillaria perezdelarosae
 Mammillaria petrophila
 Mammillaria petterssonii
 Mammillaria plumosa – feather cactus
 Mammillaria polythele
 Mammillaria pondii
 Mammillaria poselgeri
 Mammillaria pottsii – rattail cactus
 Mammillaria prolifera – Texas nipple cactus
 Mammillaria rekoi
 Mammillaria rettigiana
 Mammillaria rhodantha – rainbow pincushion
 Mammillaria saboae
 Mammillaria sanchez-mejoradae
 Mammillaria sartorii
 Mammillaria schiedeana
 Mammillaria schumannii
 Mammillaria schwarzii
 Mammillaria sempervivi
 Mammillaria senilis - a.k.a. Cochemiea senilis, a.k.a. Mamillopsis senilis, a.k.a. Mamillopsis diguetii, a.k.a. Mammillaria diguetii
 Mammillaria sheldonii – Sheldon's pincushion
 Mammillaria sphaerica – longimamma nipple cactus
 Mammillaria spinosissima – red-headed Irishman
 Mammillaria spinosissima ssp. pilcayensis – bristle brush cactus
 Mammillaria standleyi
 Mammillaria supertexta
 Mammillaria surculosa
 Mammillaria tayloriorum
 Mammillaria tetrancistra – California pincushion
 Mammillaria theresae
 Mammillaria thornberi – clustered fishhook pincushion
 Mammillaria uncinata
 Mammillaria vetula
 Mammillaria voburnensis
 Mammillaria weingartiana
 Mammillaria wiesingeri
 Mammillaria winterae
 Mammillaria wrightii – brown pincushion
 Mammillaria wrightii ssp. wilcoxii – Wilcox's nipple cactus
 Mammillaria zeilmanniana

Distribution and habitat 
Mammillarias is predominantly found in Mexico but also have a wide range of distribution in neighboring regions north of the equator including the southwest United States, the Caribbean, Guatemala and Honduras. The southernmost limits of its range appears to be Colombia, and  Venezuela, where only two known species are found. Within this wide distribution, some species will exhibit large variations depending on the locality, sometimes even within just a few hundred feet. Some of these variations are so extreme that they have resulted in classifications of new species, many of which are so limited to one locality that they are considered critically endangered.

Cultivation
Mammillarias have extremely variable spination from species to species, and attractive flowers, making them attractive for cactus hobbyists. Most mammillarias are considered easy to cultivate, though some species are among the hardest cacti to grow. Several taxa are threatened with extinction at least in the wild, due to habitat destruction and especially overcollecting for the pot plant trade. Cactus fanciers can assist conservation of these rare plants by choosing nursery-bred specimens (wild-collected ones are illegal to possess for the rarest species). Several mammillarias are relatively easy (for cacti) to grow from seeds. One such species, popular and widely available from nursery stock but endangered in the wild, is Mammillaria zeilmanniana.

Uses
Water can be extracted from the cacti.

References

Further reading
 Butterworth, Charles A. & Wallace,  Robert S. (2004): Phylogenetic studies of Mammillaria (Cactaceae) - insights from chloroplast sequence variation and hypothesis testing using the parametric bootstrap. Am. J. Bot. 91(7): 1086–1098. PDF fulltext Supplementary data

External links
 
 
 cactiguide.com is the main source for the species list, and in turn sourced from several books which are listed on that site.
 mammillarias.net is the main up-to-date internet resource, with complete species and varieties description, distribution maps and a large selection of photographs of all Mammillaria species both in nature and cultivated.
 SucculentCity Mammillaria Page:  Cultivation Data and Photographs

 
Cactoideae genera